Queen Games is a German publisher of tabletop games, based in Troisdorf and founded in 1992 by head Rajive Gupta, which specialises primarily in German-style, family-level games but has also published smaller numbers of both simpler, children's games and more complex, gamers' games.

They have shown a propensity for re-releasing previously self-published games in professionally illustrated editions, having drawn multiple times from the catalogues of db-Spiele and, more recently, Winsome Games, and re-releasing those already published by themselves with a different theme and varying degrees of revision of the rules. One of their more popular releases is Alhambra, itself developed from a game originally self-published in 1992, which won the Spiel des Jahres and placed second in the Deutscher Spiele Preis in 2003. Alhambra has since spawned many expansions and a number of standalone spin-offs and could be considered the "franchise" of the company. They are also known to some extent for publishing many games designed by Dirk Henn (and not only, though primarily, those previously self-published by him), with illustration by Jo Hartwig or Michael Menzel and/or with an Arabian theme, whether set within the Arabian Peninsula itself or an Islamic culture such as Al-Andalus. Other games published by Queen Games include Industria: 600 Years of Progress, San Francisco Cable Car and Wallenstein.

In 2000, Queen Games switched from publishing their games in traditionally horizontal, shallow, rectangularly faced boxes in various shapes and sizes to using distinctively "fatter" boxes designed for being stacked vertically in only four standardised box sizes and their publications from about 2005 to 2010 have typically been produced in both a domestic version with only German rules and an export version (recognisable by the flags indicating the included languages on the front of the box) with rules in English, French, Spanish, Italian, Dutch and German and the title on the box changed to be more language-independent (such as Alhambra instead of Der Palast von Alhambra). If the game components contain text this is replaced in the export version with either language-independent symbols (as has been the case with Alhambra and Roma) or a translation into English (as is the case with more recent releases such as Granada and Arena: Roma II). Some of their games have, however, also been re-published by publishers based in other countries in fully translated versions (these include, in the case of English-language versions, Überplay and Esdevium Games; Queen's own export versions are, as of February 2010, distributed in the United States by Rio Grande Games and in the United Kingdom by Esdevium Games). Both practices appear to be being gradually phased out as of February 2010, with most new games being packaged in shallower, square-fronted boxes and produced in one German-titled, multilingual edition; only those that are language-dependent have separate domestic and export editions.

Notable publications
Listed below are games published at some point by Queen Games that have been recommended by international awards or considered notable enough to be re-released by Queen or other publishers.

See also
List of game manufacturers

References

External links
Queen Games website

Board game publishing companies
Card game publishing companies
Publishing companies established in 1992
Publishing companies of Germany
German companies established in 1992